Vernon William Laurence Daniel (30 May 1887 – 27 January 1969) was an Australian rules footballer who played with Melbourne in the Victorian Football League (VFL).

Notes

External links 

1887 births
Australian rules footballers from Victoria (Australia)
Melbourne Football Club players
1969 deaths